The American Coalition of Life Activists was an anti-abortion advocacy group that was the subject of controversy for its series of wanted-style posters.

History 
During a 1995 meeting, the group unveiled a "wanted" poster that listed the names and addresses of a "Deadly Dozen" abortion providers. The poster accused them of "crimes against humanity" and offered a $5,000 reward for the "arrest, conviction and revocation of license to practice medicine" of these physicians. The poster was published in Life Advocate magazine. A second poster targeted a doctor, Robert Crist, offered a reward for persuading him "to turn from his child killing," and included his name, address, and photo.

In 1996 the coalition revealed its "Nuremberg Files" which included dossiers on abortion providers, politicians, judges, clinic employees and other abortion rights supporters. They claimed that these dossiers could be used for trials for "crimes against humanity" when the nation's laws changed to prohibit abortion. Neal Horsley, an activist, published the information on his website. His website greyed the names of those injured and crossed out the names of those killed by anti-abortion activists.

In Planned Parenthood of Columbia/Willamette v. American Coalition of Life Activists, Planned Parenthood successfully sued the American Coalition of Life Activists. Although the posters and website did not contain any specific threat, the jury awarded $107 million. The coalition appealed the verdict on First Amendment grounds. A panel of the 9th Circuit Court of Appeals initially overturned the verdict, holding that the activities were protected under the First Amendment because they did not directly threaten harm to the plaintiffs, and because the statements were not communicated privately to the plaintiffs. The en banc 9th Circuit reversed the panel, and held that the coalition could be held liable in damages because the website made a deliberate threat with the expectation that someone would act on it, unprotected by the First Amendment.

References

Anti-abortion organizations in the United States